Events in the year 1865 in Iceland.

Incumbents 

 Monarch: Christian IX
 Council President of Denmark: Christian Albrecht Bluhme (until 6 November); Christian Emil Krag-Juel-Vind-Frijs onwards

Establishments 

 The church at Hruni was built.

Births 

 June 6 − Axel V. Tulinius, politician

References 

 
1860s in Iceland
Years of the 19th century in Iceland
Iceland
Iceland